Frenchman's Farm is a 1986 Australian horror mystery film.

Filming started 17 February 1986.

Plot synopsis
Jackie Grenville is a university student in Australia, motoring through the rural region and suddenly finding herself in the 40s. She witnesses a horrible murder and is then zapped back to present times. After retracing her steps, she and her boyfriend Barry Norden try to solve the mystery and end up unearthing an unexpected fortune and a crazed killer.

Cast
Tracey Tainsh as Jackie Grenville
David Reyne as Barry Norden
Norman Kaye as Reverend Aldershot
John Meillon as Bill Dolan
Ray Barrett as Harry Benson
Phil Brock as John Hatcher
Andrew Blackman as John Mainsbridge
Andrew Johnston as William Morris

References

External links
Frenchman's Farm at IMDb
 
Frenchman's Farm at Oz Movies

Australian horror films
1980s English-language films
1980s Australian films